Qaddita (transliteration: Qaddîtâ) was a Palestinian Arab village of 240, located  northwest of Safad. It was captured and depopulated in the 1948 Arab-Israeli War, with some of its inhabitants expelled or fleeing to nearby Akbara where they live as internally displaced Palestinians and others to refugee camps in Lebanon or Syria.

History
It is possible that the name "Qaddita" is an Arabic distortion of the Aramaic word kaddish.

Ottoman era
Qaddita was under the Ottoman Empire in 1517, and by 1596 it was administrated by the nahiya ("subdistrict") of Jira, part of Sanjak Safad. The population was 27 households, an estimated 149 inhabitants, all Muslims. They paid a fixed  tax rate of 25%  on wheat, barley, vineyards, beehives, and goats; a total of 4,030  akçe.

The village appeared under the name of Kadis on the map that Pierre Jacotin compiled during Napoleon's invasion of 1799.

The village was reported to be totally destroyed in the devastating Galilee earthquake of 1837. In  1838,  Robinson noted: "Kadita has many vineyards and fig trees in its neighbourhood, and was greatly injured by the earthquake." He also noted it as a village located in the Safad district.

In 1875,  Victor Guérin  found "only ten houses, inhabited by as many Moslem families. Cisterns cut in the rock prove that it is the site of an ancient place."

In 1881, the PEF's Survey of Western Palestine (SWP)  described  Kadditha:   "a mud and stone village, containing about 200 Muslems, situated on the slope of a hill, with gardens of figs. There is a birket and spring "

A population list from about 1887 showed  Kadditha to have  about  315  inhabitants;  all Muslims.

British Mandate era
Under the rule of the British Mandate in Palestine, Qaddita expanded north and south, its houses were clustered together, and built of stone.  In the 1922 census of Palestine, Qaddita  had a population of 110; all Muslims,  increasing in the 1931 census to 170, still all  Muslims,  in  a total of 32  houses.

Its economy was based on animal husbandry and crop cultivation, mainly grains, figs, pomegranates, and grapes as well as olives which by 1943 covered 77 dunams.  In the  1945 statistics the population was 240 Muslims,  and the total land area was 2,441 dunums;  Of this,  150 dunums was  plantations and irrigable land, 1,452  cereals, while 31 dunams were built-up (urban) land.

1948, and after
Like many other Palestinian villages in the eastern Galilee, Qaddita was evacuated a day after Safad fell to the Israelis during Operation Yiftach on May 10. Some villagers were evicted to the village of Akbara, south of Safad, where they, according to Walid Khalidi, lived under harrowing circumstances. No Jewish towns were built on village lands. Khalidi describes the remains of the village being "tombs from the cemetery and stone rubble from the destroyed homes."

See also
Kadita
Hamaam

References

Bibliography

External links
 Welcome to Qaddita
 Qaddita, Zochrot
Survey of Western Palestine, Map 4: IAA, Wikimedia commons
Qaddita, from the Khalil Sakakini Cultural Center
Qaddita, Dr. Khalil Rizk

Arab villages depopulated prior to the 1948 Arab–Israeli War
District of Safad